Charles Kelland (1660–1695), of Painsford, Ashprington, Devon, was an English politician.

He was a Member (MP) of the Parliament of England for Totnes in 1681.

References

1660 births
1695 deaths
English MPs 1681
Members of the Parliament of England (pre-1707) for Totnes